Alan Rowe (14 December 1926 – 21 October 2000) was an English actor born in New Zealand.

Life and career
Rowe appeared in four Doctor Who serials between 1967 and 1980. His first role was Dr Evans in The Moonbase. His other roles in the show included Edward of Wessex in The Time Warrior, Colonel Skinsale in Horror of Fang Rock and Garif in Full Circle, which was his final Doctor Who appearance.

He took the major supporting role of William of Orange in the prizewinning 1969 BBC series The First Churchills, appearing in seven episodes. His other work included roles in Wycliffe, Inspector Morse, Rumpole of the Bailey, Minder, Forever Green, Young Charlie Chaplin, Lovejoy and BBC2 Playhouse.

Rowe died in Kingston upon Thames, Surrey on 21 October 2000, aged 73. He was survived by his long-term partner, fellow actor Geoffrey Bayldon.

Filmography

References

External links
 

1926 births
2000 deaths
English male stage actors
English male film actors
English male television actors
People from Palmerston North
English gay actors
20th-century English male actors
20th-century LGBT people